Megalobulimus is a genus of air-breathing land snail, a terrestrial gastropod mollusk in the subfamily Megalobuliminae within the family Strophocheilidae (according to the taxonomy of the Gastropoda by Bouchet & Rocroi, 2005). 

Megalobulimus is the type genus of the subfamily Megalobuliminae.

Species
Species within the genus Megalobulimus include (all species from Brazil are listed):
 Megalobulimus abbreviatus (Bequaert, 1948)
 Megalobulimus albescens (Bequaert, 1948)
 Megalobulimus albus (Bland & Binney, 1872)
 Megalobulimus amandus Simone, 2012
 Megalobulimus arapotiensis Lange-de-Morretes, 1952
 Megalobulimus auritus (Sowerby, 1838)
 Megalobulimus bertae Lange-de-Morretes, 1952
 Megalobulimus bronni (Pfeiffer, 1847)
 Megalobulimus capillaceus (Pfeiffer, 1855)
 Megalobulimus cardosoi (Lange-de-Morretes, 1952)
 Megalobulimus carrikeri (Pilsbry, 1930)
 Megalobulimus castelnaudi (Hupé, 1857)
 Megalobulimus chionostoma (Mörch, 1852)
 Megalobulimus conicus (Bequaert, 1948)
 Megalobulimus crassus (Albers, 1850)
 Megalobulimus dryades Fontenelle, Simone & Cavallari, 2021
 Megalobulimus elongatus (Bequaert, 1948)
 Megalobulimus elsae Falconeri, 1994
 Megalobulimus felipponei Ihering, 1928
 Megalobulimus florezi Borda & Ramírez, 2013
 Megalobulimus foreli (Bequaert, 1948)
 Megalobulimus formicacorsii (Barattini & Ledón, 1949)
 Megalobulimus fragilior (Ihering, 1901)
 Megalobulimus garbeanus (Leme, 1964)
 Megalobulimus globosus (Martens, 1876)
 Megalobulimus grandis (Martens, 1885)
 Megalobulimus granulosus (Rang, 1831)
 Megalobulimus gummatus (Hidalgo, 1870)
 Megalobulimus haemastomus (Scopoli, 1786)
 † Megalobulimus hauthali (Ihering, 1904) 
 Megalobulimus hector (Pfeiffer, 1857)
 Megalobulimus helicoides Simone, 2018
 Megalobulimus huascari (Tschudi, 1852)
 Megalobulimus inambarisensis Borda & Ramírez, 2016
 Megalobulimus indigens (Fulton, 1914)
 Megalobulimus intercedens (E. von Martens, 1876)
 Megalobulimus intertextus (Pilsbry, 1895)
 Megalobulimus jaguarunensis Fontenelle, Cavallari & Simone, 2014
 Megalobulimus klappenbachi (Leme, 1964)
 Megalobulimus lacunosus (d'Orbigny, 1835)
 Megalobulimus leonardosi (Lange-de-Morretes, 1952)
 Megalobulimus leucostoma (G. B. Sowerby I, 1835)
 Megalobulimus lichtensteini Albers, 1854
 Megalobulimus lopesi Leme, 1989
 Megalobulimus mauricius Falconeri, 1995
 Megalobulimus maximus (Sowerby, 1825)
 Megalobulimus mogianensis Simone & Leme, 1998
 Megalobulimus musculus (Bequaert, 1948)
 Megalobulimus nodai Lange-de-Morretes, 1952
 Megalobulimus oblongus (Müller, 1774)
 Megalobulimus oliveirai (Bequaert, 1948)
 Megalobulimus oosomus (Pilsbry, 1895)
 Megalobulimus ovatus (Müller, 1774)
 Megalobulimus parafragilior Leme & Indrusiak, 1990
 Megalobulimus paranaguensis (Pilsbry & Ihering, 1900)
 Megalobulimus pergranulatus (Pilsbry, 1901)
 Megalobulimus pintoi Lange-de-Morretes, 1952
 Megalobulimus popelairianus (Nyst, 1845) - synonym: Strophocheilus popelairianus
 Megalobulimus proclivis (Martens, 1888)
 Megalobulimus pygmaeus (Bequaert, 1948)
 Megalobulimus riopretensis Simone & Leme, 1998
 Megalobulimus rolandianus Lange-de-Morretes, 1952
 Megalobulimus sanctipauli (Ihering & Pilsbry, 1900)
 Megalobulimus santacruzii (d'Orbigny, 1835)
 Megalobulimus senezi (Jousseaume, 1884)
 Megalobulimus separabilis (Fulton, 1903)
 Megalobulimus tayacajus Borda & Ramírez, 2016
 Megalobulimus terrestris (Spix, 1827)
 Megalobulimus valenciennesii (Pfeiffer, 1842)
 Megalobulimus versatilis (Fulton, 1905)
 Megalobulimus vestitus (Pilsbry, 1926)
 † Megalobulimus wichmanni Miquel & Manceñido, 1999 
 Megalobulimus wohlersi Lange-de-Morretes, 1952
 Megalobulimus yporanganus (Ihering & Pilsbry, 1901)
Species brought into synonymy
 Megalobulimus bereniceae (Lange-de-Morretes, 1952): synonym of Megalobulimus intertextus (Pilsbry, 1895) (superseded combination)
 Megalobulimus inambarisense [sic]: synonym of Megalobulimus inambarisensis Borda & Ramírez, 2016 (wrong gender agreement of specific epithet)
 Megalobulimus torii Lange-de-Morretes, 1937: synonym of Megalobulimus yporanganus (Ihering & Pilsbry, 1901)
 Megalobulimus valenciennesi (L. Pfeiffer, 1842): synonym of Megalobulimus valenciennesii (L. Pfeiffer, 1842) (incorrect spelling)

Human use 
Shells of terrestrial snails, mainly of the genus Megalobulimus, are found in fluvial shellmound (called sambaqui in Brazil) on the Capelinha archaeological site from paleoamerican culture of early Holocene.

The shell of Megalobulimus sp. (local name: "churito") is used in the traditional ethnomedicine of Northwest Argentina when babies are hyperactive and cannot sleep well, then it is advised to put a shell under a pillow.

References

Further reading 
 Kawano T. & Moreira Leme J. L. (1994). "Chromosomes of three species of Megalobulimus (Gastropoda: Mesurethra: Megalobulimidae) from Brazil". Malacological review 27(1-2): 47-52. 
 Borda V., Ramírez R. & Romero P. (2010). "Glándula pediosa de moluscos terrestres y sus implicancias evolutivas, con énfasis en Megalobulimus / Pediose gland in land snails and its evolutionary implications, with emphasis on Megalobulimus." Revista Peruana de Biología 17(1): . 43-52. PDF.
 Rodrigo Salvador, José Fontenelle, Barbara Mizumo Tomotani: Taxonomic reassessment of Megalobulimus toriii (Gastropoda, Strophocheilidae); Journal of Conchology issue 3 vol. 43 p 313-320, 2019.

External links 
 Breure, A. S. H. & Araujo, R. (2017). The Neotropical land snails (Mollusca, Gastropoda) collected by the “Comisión Científica del Pacífico.”. PeerJ. 5, e3065
 photos

 
Strophocheilidae

Taxonomy articles created by Polbot